Yanbolagh (also Romanized as Yānbolāgh; also known as Yan-Bulag and Yānbulāq) is a village in Kaghazkonan-e Shomali Rural District, Kaghazkonan District, Meyaneh County, East Azerbaijan Province, Iran. At the 2006 census, its population was 318, in 90 families.

References 

Populated places in Meyaneh County